Rida El Barjiji (born 20 October 2001) is a Dutch professional footballer who plays as a midfielder.

Career
El Barjiji progressed through the youth academy of FC Utrecht. Before that, he played in the youth departments of AFC and Almere City. On 10 August 2019, he made his debut for Jong FC Utrecht in the Eerste Divisie against Excelsior, coming on as a substitute in the 78th minute for Odysseus Velanas in the 2–0 defeat.

Career statistics

Club

References

External links
 

2001 births
Living people
Dutch footballers
Association football midfielders
Amsterdamsche FC players
Almere City FC players
FC Utrecht players
Jong FC Utrecht players
Eerste Divisie players
Dutch sportspeople of Moroccan descent
Footballers from Almere